Launch Complex 43 (LC-43) at Cape Canaveral Space Force Station, Florida was a launch complex used by American sounding rockets between 1962 and 1984. It supported 2,038 sounding rocket launches. In 1984, sounding rocket launches moved to LC-47, and LC-43 was demolished to make way for Launch Complex 46, which was built near the site.

References

External links
 Cape Canaveral virtual tour

Cape Canaveral Space Force Station